Phlegmacium boreicyanites is a species of fungus in the family Cortinariaceae

Taxonomy 
It was originally described in 2014 and classified as Cortinarius boreicyanites. It was placed in the (subgenus Phlegmacium) of the large mushroom genus Cortinarius.

In 2022 the species was transferred from Cortinarius and reclassified as Thaxterogaster argyrionus based on genomic data.

Description 
Initially bluish gray, the cap colour matures to pale grayish brown. Gills on the cap underside have an emarginate attachment to the stipe. They start out greyish blue before changing to brownish violet when the spores mature.

Etymology 
The specific epithet boreicyanites refers to its close relationship to Cortinarius cyanites, and its boreal distribution.

Habitat and distribution 
Found in the boreal mixed forests of Europe (Sweden, Finland and Scotland).

See also
List of Cortinarius species

References

External links

boreicyanites
Fungi described in 2014
Fungi of Europe